Fyodorovka is a rural locality (a village) in Malinovsky Selsoviet, Belebeyevsky District, Bashkortostan, Russia. The population was 3 as of 2010. There is 1 street.

Geography 
Fyodorovka is located 23 km south of Belebey (the district's administrative centre) by road. Ik-Vershina is the nearest rural locality.

References 

Rural localities in Belebeyevsky District